Fabrizio Chiari (c.1615–1695) was an Italian painter and  engraver who spent his entire life in Rome.

Chiari's early etchings from Nicolas Poussin paintings are described by Michael Bryan as "executed in a scratchy but masterly style"; among them are:
Mars and Venus, in a landscape, signed "Fabritius Clarus" 1635.
Venus and Mercury with Children, signed "Chlarus" 1636
Venus and Adonis, signed "Nicolaus Pussinus"; This etching has been erroneously attributed to Poussin.

Chiari was enrolled in the Accademia di San Luca from 1635. In San Martino ai Monti in the 1640s he painted the altarpiece, St Martin Dividing his Cloak with the Beggar, and a fresco, The Baptism of Christ, which was overpainted in the 18th century by Antonio Cavallucci. To mark the 1658 canonization of Thomas of Villanova, he painted St. Thomas of Villanova Distributing Alms for Santa Maria del Popolo. His Assumption of the Virgin and Death of St Anne, commissioned in 1654 for the chapel of Regina Coeli convent, were misplaced when it became a prison in 1880; the latter turned up in 2012 and in 2019 sold for $30,000 at Sotheby's.

Footnotes

References

Further reading
 

1610s births
1695 deaths
Painters from Rome
17th-century Italian painters
Italian male painters
Italian engravers
Fresco painters